François Ponchaud (born 1939) is a French Catholic priest and missionary to Cambodia. He is best known for his documentation of the genocide which occurred under the Khmer Rouge (KR), and for being one of the first people to expose the human rights abuses being carried out at the time.

Biography
Ponchaud was born in Sallanches, France, and was one of twelve children. He attended seminary in 1958 but the following year he left due to national service. He spent three years in Algeria as a paratrooper during the Algerian War and returned to his studies in 1961, becoming a Jesuit. He applied through the Paris Foreign Missions Society for an assignment to undertake missionary work, and was assigned to Cambodia.

Ponchaud was 26 years old and newly ordained when he arrived in Cambodia in 1965. He lived in Cambodia from 1965 to 1975. When Phnom Penh fell to the KR on 17 April 1975, Ponchaud was detained in the French embassy. On 8 May 1975, the KR evacuated the embassy, and Ponchaud was one of the last westerners to leave Cambodia. He is fluent in Khmer.

Following the Communist Party of Kampuchea victory, all contact with the outside world was shut down, but following an editorial in Le Monde in February 1976, Ponchaud wrote a three-page article, which described the systematic abuses he had witnessed while Phnom Penh was being emptied, and following this he wrote Cambodge année zéro (Cambodia: Year Zero), a book on the Cambodian genocide, which was published in 1977, and his book is credited with being one of the first publications which dealt with the genocide. William Shawcross has said that the book is, "the best account of Khmer Rouge rule".

For four years after his expulsion, he and François Bizot helped Cambodian and French citizens escape from Cambodia. Following the overthrow of the KR in 1979, he returned to Cambodia.  He gave evidence at the Extraordinary Chambers in the Courts of Cambodia in 2013 during the war crime trials were being held. While on the stand, he said that he had been a witness to the "illegal" bombing, known as Operation Menu, of Cambodia by the American air force, and that Henry Kissinger, former Secretary of State should stand trial for his actions.

Ponchaud has said of the genocide that it, "Was above all, the translation into action the particular vision of a man [sic]: A person who has been spoiled by a corrupt regime cannot be reformed, he must be physically eliminated from the brotherhood of the pure." In testimony given on what had happened to officers from the former Lon Nol regime, Ponchaud stated that in 1975 the KR had as an aim the destruction of anyone who had cooperated with both the US and the previous regime, and that he had heard from four witnesses that the KR had killed 380 people in Phnom Thipdey, a commune in Battambang Province.

In 2001 a documentary titled The Cross and the Bodhi Tree: Two Christian Encounters with Buddhism was released, the film is about how Buddhism has shaped both the life of Ponchaud, and that of a Protestant nun, Mother Rosemary.

Published works 

Cambodia: Year Zero, Holt, Rinehart & Winston, 1978, 
Social Change in the Vortex of Revolution, in: Cambodia 1975-1978: Rendezvous with Death, Princeton University Press, 1989, Karl Jackson, ed., pp. 151–177. 
La cathédrale de la rizière: 450 ans d'histoire de l'église au Cambodge, Fayard, 1990, 
Buddha e Cristo: le due salvezze, EDB, 2005, 
 Brève histoire du Cambodge: Le pays des Khmers rouges, Magellan & Cie Éditions, 2015

References

Bibliography

1939 births
Missionaries
Paris Foreign Missions Society missionaries
People of the Cambodian genocide
Living people
French Roman Catholic missionaries
French expatriates in Cambodia
Roman Catholic missionaries in Cambodia